H.A.A.R.P. may refer to:
High Frequency Active Auroral Research Program, an investigation project to understand, simulate and control ionospheric processes 
HAARP, a live album by English rock band Muse, named after the investigation